Frinvillier, in German Friedliswart, is a village in the Canton of Bern, district of Courtelary. Its populations is around 185 people. It belongs to the Bernese Jura, on the territory of the community Vauffelin.

Tourism
In Frinvillier starts the path leaving the Jura Mountains into the Taubenloch gorge, dug out by the Suze, till Biel/Bienne on the Swiss Plateau.

External links
Article dans le Dictionnaire historique de la Suisse 
Site officiel de la commune de Vauffelin

Villages in the canton of Bern